Vasilios Ioannidis (born 24 June 1967) is a retired Greek football defender.

Honours
Panionios
 Greek Cup: 1997–98

References

1967 births
Living people
Greek footballers
Apollon Pontou FC players
Olympiacos F.C. players
Panionios F.C. players
Proodeftiki F.C. players
Association football defenders
Greece international footballers
Footballers from Komotini